Tennessee's 21st Senate district is one of 33 districts in the Tennessee Senate. It has been represented by Democrat Jeff Yarbro, the current Senate Minority Leader, since 2014.

Geography
District 21 is a convoluted district covering much of central Nashville and its inner suburbs in Davidson County, snaking its way from the Nations and Sylvan Park, down to Berry Hill and Grassmere, eastwards to the border of La Vergne, and back north to the East Nashville communities near Shelby Park. Vanderbilt University and the Nashville International Airport are both located within the district.

The district is located entirely within Tennessee's 5th congressional district, and overlaps with the 51st, 52nd, 53rd, 54th, 55th, 56th, 58th, 59th, and 60th districts of the Tennessee House of Representatives.

Recent election results
Tennessee Senators are elected to staggered four-year terms, with odd-numbered districts holding elections in midterm years and even-numbered districts holding elections in presidential years.

2018

2014

Federal and statewide results in District 21

References 

21
Davidson County, Tennessee